Maringá Futebol Clube, usually shortened to Maringá, is a Brazilian football team from Maringá in the southern state of Paraná. The club was founded on 27 November 2010 as Grêmio Metropolitano Maringá. Their stadium, the Estádio Willie Davids was built in 1957.

The name Maringá Futebol Clube was used previously by an unrelated club founded in 1995 that after winning the title of the Second Division in its first participation, participated in the Campeonato Paranaense from 1996 to 1998 and also participated in the Campeonato Brasileiro Série C in 1997.

In the same years of its foundation already won the 3rd Division State Championship and got promoted to 2nd Division, where the club played 3 years in a row from 2011 to 2013. When, finally, they won the championship and got promoted to 1st Division of the State.

In their 1st participation in 2014, the club reached the finals, eventually losing to Londrina. In 2015 they won Copa Paraná, a second level tournament, the state cup.

In 2016 they got relegated to Campeonato Paranaense Série B and won it in 2017. They also won Copa Paraná again that year.

After that, played 2 more years in State's 1st Division (2018 and 2019), then got relegated again to 2nd Division in 2019.

Achievements
Copa Paraná: 2
2015, 2017

Campeonato Paranaense Série Prata: 2
2013, 2017

Campeonato Paranaense Série Bronze: 1
2010

References

External links
Official Website